Barra do Piraí is a municipality of the Brazilian state of Rio de Janeiro. It is located at latitude 22º28'12" South and longitude 43º49'32" East. Its population is 100,764 (2020) and its area is 578.471 km². It is 114 km from Rio de Janeiro.

The municipality contains part of the  Serra da Concórdia State Park, created in 2002.

References

Municipalities in Rio de Janeiro (state)